Stephen Denmark (born April 20, 1996) is an American football cornerback for the San Antonio Brahmas of the XFL. He played college football at Valdosta State. He was drafted by the Chicago Bears in the seventh round of the 2019 NFL Draft. Denmark has also been a member of the Cleveland Browns, Pittsburgh Steelers, and Green Bay Packers.

Early life
At James S. Rickards High School, Denmark ran track and played for the football team. In 2013, Rickards reached the Class 5A state playoffs with a 9–2 record; Denmark had 49 receptions for 851 yards and 12 touchdowns, along with two kickoff return touchdowns.

College career
Denmark attended Valdosta State, where he played wide receiver for three years. In 2018, Denmark converted to cornerback, where he recorded 55 tackles and three interceptions as Valdosta State won the NCAA Division II Football Championship.

Professional career

Chicago Bears
Denmark was drafted by the Chicago Bears in the seventh round (238th overall) of the 2019 NFL Draft. Before the draft, Denmark worked out with Bears secondary coach Deshea Townsend and assistant director of player personnel Champ Kelly. He signed his four-year rookie contract on May 13. On August 31, 2019, the Bears released Denmark as part of final roster cuts and was signed to the practice squad the next day. On December 30, 2019, Denmark was signed to a reserve/future contract. After being waived on September 5, 2020, Denmark was added to the practice squad a day later. He was released on October 5.

Cleveland Browns
On November 10, 2020, Denmark was signed to the Cleveland Browns' practice squad. Denmark was released from the Browns' practice squad on December 1, 2020.

Pittsburgh Steelers
On January 21, 2021, Denmark signed a reserve/future contract with the Pittsburgh Steelers. He was waived on August 17, 2021.

Green Bay Packers
On August 25, 2021, Denmark signed with the Green Bay Packers. On August 31, 2021, Packers released Denmark as part of their final roster cuts.

Saskatchewan Roughriders 
On March 23, 2022 it was announced that Denmark had signed with the Saskatchewan Roughriders of the Canadian Football League (CFL).

San Antonio Brahmas 
On November 17, 2022, Denmark was drafted by the San Antonio Brahmas of the XFL. He signed with the team on February 21, 2023.

References

External links
Valdosta State bio

1996 births
Living people
Players of American football from Tallahassee, Florida
American football defensive backs
Valdosta State Blazers football players
Chicago Bears players
Cleveland Browns players
Pittsburgh Steelers players
Green Bay Packers players
Saskatchewan Roughriders players
San Antonio Brahmas players